Development of Windows XP started in 1999 as a successor to the Windows Neptune and Windows Odyssey projects. Neptune was originally going to be the successor of Windows Me, though based on the NT kernel. Microsoft merged the teams working on Neptune with that of Windows Odyssey, Windows 2000's successor, in early 2000. The resulting project, codenamed "Whistler", went on to become Windows XP.

Development work on Windows XP was completed on August 24, 2001, and the operating system was released on October 25 of that year.

"Neptune" and "Odyssey" 

In the late 1990s, initial development of what would become Windows XP was focused on two individual products; "Odyssey", which was reportedly intended to succeed the future Windows 2000, and "Neptune", which was reportedly a consumer-oriented operating system using the Windows NT architecture, succeeding the MS-DOS-based Windows 98. Based on the NT 5.0 kernel in Windows 2000, Neptune primarily focused on offering a simplified, task-based interface based on a concept known internally as "activity centers", originally planned to be implemented in Windows 98.  A number of activity centers were planned, serving as hubs for email communications, playing music, managing or viewing photos, searching the Internet, and viewing recently used content. A single build of Neptune, 5111 (which still carried the branding of Windows 2000 in places), revealed early work on the activity center concept, with an updated user account interface and graphical login screen, common functions (such as recently used programs) being accessible from a customizable "Starting Places" page (which could be used as either a separate window, or a full-screen desktop replacement). It was later confirmed that Microsoft were planning a successor to Neptune known as Triton, although it was originally thought to be a service pack to Neptune.

However, the project proved to be too ambitious. Microsoft discussed a plan to delay Neptune in favor of an interim OS known as "Asteroid", which would have been an update to Windows 2000 (Windows NT 5.0), and have a consumer-oriented version. At the WinHEC conference on April 7, 1999, Steve Ballmer announced an updated version of Windows 98 known as Windows Millennium, breaking a promise made by Microsoft CEO Bill Gates in 1998 that Windows 98 would be the final consumer-oriented version of Windows to use the MS-DOS architecture. Concepts introduced by Neptune would influence future Windows products; in Windows Me, the activity center concept was used for System Restore and Help and Support Center (which both combined Win32 code with an interface rendered using Internet Explorer's layout engine), the hub concept would be expanded on Windows Phone, and Windows 8 would similarly use a simplified user interface running atop the existing Windows shell.

"Whistler" 

In January 2000, shortly prior to the official release of Windows 2000, technology writer Paul Thurrott reported that Microsoft had shelved both Neptune and Odyssey in favor of a new product codenamed "Whistler", after Whistler, British Columbia, as many Microsoft employees skied at the Whistler-Blackcomb ski resort. The goal of Whistler was to unify both the consumer and business-oriented Windows lines under a single, Windows NT platform: Thurrott stated that Neptune had become "a black hole when all the features that were cut from Windows Me were simply re-tagged as Neptune features. And since Neptune and Odyssey would be based on the same code-base anyway, it made sense to combine them into a single project". At WinHEC in April 2000, Microsoft officially announced and presented an early build of Whistler, focusing on a new modularized architecture, built-in CD burning, fast user switching, and updated versions of the digital media features introduced by Me. Windows general manager Carl Stork stated that Whistler would be released in both consumer- and business-oriented versions built atop the same architecture, and that there were plans to update the Windows interface to make it "warmer and more friendly".

In June 2000, Microsoft began the technical beta testing process. Whistler was expected to be made available in "Personal", "Professional", "Server", "Advanced Server", and "Datacenter" editions. At PDC on July 13, 2000, Microsoft announced that Whistler would be released during the second half of 2001, and also released the first preview build, 2250. The build notably introduced an early version of a new visual styles system along with an interim theme known as "Professional" (later renamed  "Watercolor"), and contained a hidden "Start page" (a full-screen page similar to Neptune's "Starting Places") and a hidden, early version of a two-column Start menu design. Watercolor was never meant to be the final theme for Whistler; in fact, it has been stated that Microsoft used it as a decoy until they were ready to show Luna. Build 2257 featured further refinements to the Watercolor theme, along with the official introduction of the two-column Start menu, and the addition of an early version of Windows Firewall.

Beta versions 
Microsoft released Whistler Beta 1, build 2296, on October 31, 2000. In January 2001, build 2410 introduced Internet Explorer 6.0 (previously branded as 5.6) and the Microsoft Product Activation system. Bill Gates dedicated a portion of his keynote at Consumer Electronics Show to discuss Whistler, explaining that the OS would bring "[the] dependability of our highest end corporate desktop, and total dependability, to the home," and also "move it in the direction of making it very consumer-oriented. Making it very friendly for the home user to use." Alongside Beta 1, it was also announced that Microsoft would prioritize the release of the consumer-oriented versions of Whistler over the server-oriented versions in order to gauge reaction, but that they would be both generally available during the second half of 2001 (Whistler Server would ultimately be delayed into 2003). Builds 2416 and 2419 added the Files and Settings Transfer Wizard and began to introduce elements of the operating system's final appearance (such as its near-final Windows Setup design, and the addition of new default wallpapers, such as Bliss).

Announcement 
On February 5, 2001, Whistler was officially unveiled during a media event under the name Windows XP, where XP stands for "eXPerience". As a complement, the next version of Microsoft Office was also announced as Office XP. Microsoft stated that the name "[symbolizes] the rich and extended user experiences Windows and Office can offer by embracing Web services that span a broad range of devices." In a press event at EMP Museum in Seattle on February 13, 2001, Microsoft publicly unveiled the new "Luna" user interface of Windows XP. Windows XP Beta 2, build 2462a (which among other improvements, introduced the Luna style), was launched at WinHEC on March 25, 2001.

In April 2001, Microsoft controversially announced that XP would not integrate support for Bluetooth or USB 2.0 on launch, requiring the use of third-party drivers. Critics felt that in the case of the latter, Microsoft's decision had delivered a potential blow to the adoption of USB 2.0, as XP was to provide support for the competing, Apple-developed FireWire standard instead. A representative stated that the company had "[recognized] the importance of USB 2.0 as a newly emerging standard and is evaluating the best mechanism for making it available to Windows XP users after the initial release." USB 2.0 support was later added with Service Pack 1, and Bluetooth support was partially added with Service Pack 2. The builds prior to and following Release Candidate 1 (build 2505, released on July 5, 2001),  and Release Candidate 2 (build 2526, released on July 27, 2001), focused on fixing bugs, acknowledging user feedback, and other final tweaks before the RTM build.

Release 
In June 2001, Microsoft indicated that it was planning to, in conjunction with Intel and other PC makers, spend at least US$1 billion on marketing and promoting Windows XP. The theme of the campaign, "Yes You Can", was designed to emphasize the platform's overall capabilities. Microsoft had originally planned to use the slogan "Prepare to Fly", but it was replaced due to sensitivity issues in the wake of the September 11 attacks. A prominent aspect of Microsoft's campaign was a U.S. television commercial featuring Madonna's song "Ray of Light"; a Microsoft spokesperson stated that the song was chosen due to its optimistic tone and how it complemented the overall theme of the campaign.

On August 24, 2001, Windows XP build 2600 was released to manufacturing. During a ceremonial media event at Microsoft Redmond Campus, copies of the RTM build were given to representatives of several major PC manufacturers in briefcases, who then flew off on decorated helicopters. While PC manufacturers would be able to release devices running XP beginning on September 24, 2001, XP was expected to reach general, retail availability on October 25, 2001. On the same day, Microsoft also announced the final retail pricing of XP's two main editions, "Home" (as a replacement for Windows Me for home computing) and "Professional" (as a replacement for Windows 2000 for high-end users).

See also
 Windows 2000
 Windows Me
 Windows XP
 History of Microsoft Windows

References